Duach Jock (born 20 December 1986) is a South Sudanese footballer who plays for the North County Battalion in National Premier Soccer League.

Early life
Jock was born in Ethiopia to South Sudanese refugee parents. He and his parents moved to the United States before South Sudan independence from Sudan and became American citizens.

International career
Jock was selected for the final roster of the South Sudan national football team to compete in the 2013 CECAFA Cup in Kenya.

References

External links
 LA Blues profile

1986 births
Living people
Sportspeople from Gambela Region
Sudanese emigrants to the United States
Naturalized citizens of the United States
People with acquired South Sudanese citizenship
American soccer players
South Sudanese footballers
Association football defenders
Orange County SC players
USL Championship players
South Sudan international footballers
African-American soccer players
American people of South Sudanese descent
American sportspeople of African descent
Sportspeople of South Sudanese descent